Orestes Quércia (18 August 1938 – 24 December 2010) was a Brazilian politician. He was the 28th governor of São Paulo State.

Quércia moved with his family from Pedregulho to the city of Campinas, where he graduated in journalism. He was also a lawyer and an entrepreneur since 1962, with a diploma from the Pontifícia Universidade Católica.

He was married to Alaíde Barbosa Ulson Quércia since the 80s until his death after a long battle against prostate cancer on 24 December 2010 link label. He died with 72 years old, leaving his four children and the wife.

Educational formation
The son of Octavio Quércia and Isaura Roque Quércia, Orestes Quércia lived in Pedregulho and moved to Campinas with his family when still a teenager. Elected the vice-president of the student council in his high school, in his senior year he joined as a reporter to the local newspaper Diário do Povo (Campinas), and got accepted at Pontifícia Universidade Católica de Campinas (PUCC) in its law school program. At university, he was the director of the newspaper Centro Acadêmico 16 de Abril(journal of Academic Center April 16) and he founded the Universidade de Cultura Popular (University of Popular Culture) linked to the Pontifícia Universidade Católica de Campinas (PUCC). From 1959 to 1963 Quércia was the radio announcer for two radios: Rádio Cultura and Rádio Brasil, he also worked at the newspaper Jornal de Campinas which was a branch of Última Hora newspaper. Subsequently, he became the president of the press association of Campinas and also worked as a production assistant at the Highways department.

Political career
Orestes Quércia began his political career when was elected alderman of Campinas in the PL (Liberator Party) in 1962. A few years after the multiparty system ended, and he chose the MDB (Brazilian Democratic Movement) and in this party was elected state representative in 1966 and mayor of Campinas in 1968.

After electing his successor in 1972, Quércia began organizing directories of his party (MDB) everywhere in the São Paulo state and in the party convention as a candidate for the Senate of Brazil he won the contest with over Lino de Matos e Samir Achôa. In 1974, he was 
elected senator after a tied competition with Carvalho Pinto that was appointed as favorite running for re-election with the ARENA (National Renewal Alliance Party). Quércia was very critical about the economic policy during the government of Ernesto Geisel in 1977 and during this period  was reported the occurrence of corruption during his period as a mayor of Campinas, but the claims were  never not proven. The return of multiparty politics  made him  join to the PMDB party in 1980 and declared himself a candidate to succeed the governor Paulo Maluf in February 1981, a position he maintained until a last-minute deal that made him candidate to vice governor, being  Franco Montoro the governor candidate.

In 1982 he was elected vice governor of São Paulo, but differently from the image of party unity shown during the campaign, was constant against PMDB politicians linked to the governor, he did not succeed  but tried to prevent the Congressman Mário Covas to be the mayor of São Paulo  in 1983 and the election of Senator Fernando Henrique Cardoso to the presidency of the state directory of the PMDB that same year. It was adherent to the Diretas Já and the winning campaign of Tancredo Neves toward the presidency in 1985, the year he married 
the doctor Alaíde Cristina Barbosa Ulson. At this moment he was on his way to the candidacy for governor in 1986.

After the victory of former President Jânio Quadros (Brazilian Labour Party-PTB) over Fernando Henrique Cardoso in November of that year, Orestes Quércia saw his popularity in the party increase with the movement called "quercismo" which guaranteed its nomination as candidate for governor despite internal dissidence. Candidate in an election polarized initially between deputy Paulo Maluf and the businessman Antônio de Morais Ermírio and also had the participation of the deputy Eduardo Suplicy, the clash began with low scores in surveys of opinion, however he kept his candidacy and ultimately was victorious. His government was responsible for a big growth economical of the state and for privatization of VASP in 1990, the year in which elected Luiz Antonio Fleury Filho as his successor.

Accusations of corruption 

Quercia's political career was marked by scandals and allegations of 
corruption and illicit enrichment, both in the city of Campinas and in 
government of São Paulo. Nevertheless, he never received a final conviction in the instance. He was accused of stealing material from the Roads Department(DER) to build fences on his farm in Pedregulho-SP, of 
import electronic equipment without competitive bidding of Israel, overbillings 
works of the subway, and irregularities in the privatization of VASP. 
In 1991, the then governor of Parana, Roberto Requiao, a party rival of
Quercia, created the service "Dial Quercia for Corruption", a number of 
phone in which the Brazilians could call to report him. Later, the two opponents became political allies. This year, Quercia supported the candidacy of Requião for the presidency. 
When he applied for senator in 2010, declared to the Electoral Justice that 
his assets totaled $117 million. Entrepreneur of branches and
communication business, was the owner of Sol Investment Group – New radio controller 
Brazil FM, DCI's financial newspaper, affiliated stations of the SBT (TVB 
TVB Campinas and Santos), the Shopping Jaragua and several farms.

Elections
Since Quercia left the government of São Paulo in 1991, failed to win any other election- was the PMDB candidate for president in 1994, the state government in 1998/2006 and the Senate in 2002 (would be a candidate for the Senate again in 2010, but renounced 
application due to the treatment of prostate cancer).

Quercia had the 4th placed the 1994 election with 2,773,793 votes (4.4% of 
valid) – and is behind the victorious Fernando Henrique Cardoso (PSDB) 
who got 34,377,198 votes (54.3% of valid), Luiz Inácio Lula da Silva 
(PT), the 2nd place with 17,126,291 votes (27% valid) and Eneas Ferreira 
Carneiro (PRONA) in the 3rd place with 4,672,026 votes (7.4% of valid).

Quercia was the 5th in the 1st round of the 1998 election with 714,097 votes (4.30% of 
valid) – behind the 1st place Paulo Maluf (PPB), which won 5,351,026 votes 
(32.21% of valid), the then Governor Mario Covas (PSDB), the 2nd place 
with 3,813,186 votes (22.95% of valid), then the federal deputy Marta 
Suplicy (PT), 3rd place with 3,738,750 votes (22.51% of valid) and 
Francisco Rossi (PDT), the 4th place with 2,843,515 votes (17.12% of valid).

He was the 3rd place in the 2002 election with 5,550,803 votes (15.8% of valid) 
– Behind the then Congressman PT Aloizio Mercadante, a senator-elect 
in 1st place with 10,491,345 votes (29.9% of valid) and Senator
PFL Romeu Tuma, re-elected in 2nd place with 7,278,185 votes (20.7% of 
valid).

Quercia had the 3rd place in the 2006 election with 977,695 votes (4.57% of valid) – 
behind the victorious José Serra (PSDB), who won 12,381,038 votes (57.93% of 
valid) and Sen. PT Aloizio Mercadante, who got 6,771,582 votes 
(31.68% of valid).

After having supported the victorious campaign Gilberto Kassab (DEM) for mayor of São Paulo in 2008, Quercia was approached by several political leaders to have his support in the 2010 elections as well. the PSDB, Quercia's party and PMDB entered into partnership supported by Jose Serra, Geraldo Alckmin and Aloysio Nunes. The PT, on the other hand, relied on the movement of President Luiz Inácio Lula da Silva to hold PMDB ruling as vice president. To strengthen the PMDB in São Paulo, Quercia toured many places in the interior getting support from other parties leaders to unite for the election of 2010. But due to a prostate cancer, he left the nomination to the São Paulo Senate on September 6, 2010, to treat the cancer.

Entrepreneur
Sol Investment Group, which owns and control Brazil FM Radio Nova, the newspaper 
Financial DCI, two regional broadcasters, TVB Campinas (from 
February, an affiliate of Rede Record) and TVB Santos (from March, affiliate 
Rede Bandeirantes), the Shopping Jaragua and several farms. His assets were valued at over $117 million.

Death

Quercia died on Christmas Eve 2010, aged 72, victim of prostate cancer, according to the Syrian-Lebanese Hospital in São Paulo. He had treated the cancer in 1990, but the tumor recurred, prompting him to give up nomination to the Senate. Quercia's  funeral was held at the Bandeirantes Palace, São Paulo, and he was buried December 25 at the Morumbi Cemetery (Cemitério do Morumbi).

References

External links
https://web.archive.org/web/20120308210800/http://www.news1130.com/news/world/article/161557--former-sao-paulo-governor-orestes-quercia-dies-at-72-in-brazil

|-

1938 births
2010 deaths
Governors of São Paulo (state)
Members of the Federal Senate (Brazil)
Mayors of Campinas
Members of the Legislative Assembly of São Paulo
Brazilian Democratic Movement politicians
Deaths from prostate cancer
Deaths from cancer in São Paulo (state)
Brazilian people of Italian descent
20th-century Brazilian politicians